The 1983 San Jose State Spartans football team represented San Jose State University during the 1983 NCAA Division I-A football season as a member of the Pacific Coast Athletic Association. The team was led by head coach Jack Elway, in his fifth year at San Jose State. They played home games at Spartan Stadium in San Jose, California. The Spartans finished the 1983 season with a record of five wins and six losses (5–6, 3–3 PCAA).

Schedule

Team players in the NFL
The following were selected in the 1984 NFL Draft.

The following finished their college career in 1983, were not drafted, but played in the NFL.

Notes

References

San Jose State
San Jose State Spartans football seasons
San Jose State Spartans football